The 6th Central Committee of the Workers' Party of Korea was elected by the 6th Congress on 14 October 1980, and remained in session until the election of the 7th Central Committee on 9 May 2016. The Central Committee composition was replenished by the 3rd WPK Conference. In between party congresses and specially convened conferences the Central Committee is the highest decision-making institution in the WPK and North Korea. The Central Committee is not a permanent institution and delegates day-to-day work to elected bodies, such as the Presidium, the Politburo, the Secretariat, the Central Military Commission and the Control Commission in the case of the 6th Central Committee. It convenes meetings, known as "Plenary Session of the [term] Central Committee", to discuss major policies. Only full members have the right to vote, but if a full member cannot attend a plenary session, the person's spot is taken over by an alternate. Plenary session can also be attended by non-members, such meetings are known as "Enlarged Plenary Session", to participate in the committee's discussions.

The 6th Central Committee convened for plenums regularly until 1993, but failed to convene a plenum for 17 years after Kim Il-sung's death in 1994. References to it being the sixth term of the Central Committee were dropped by the WPK after the 3rd Conference despite the fact that the party rules does not empower it to start a new term. It is only empowers to replace its Central Committee members.

In September 1992 it had 160 members and 143 alternate members.

The Central Committee elected by the 3rd Party Conference was made up of 124 members and 106 alternates.

Plenums

Apparatus

Members

Elected at the 6th Congress

Full

Alternates

Replenished at the 3rd Conference

Full

Alternate

References

Citations

Sources
General
References for plenary sessions, apparatus heads, the Central Committee full- and candidate membership, Political Committee membership, Standing Committee membership, secretaries, Organisation Committee members, membership in the Inspection Commission, offices an individual held, retirement, if the individual in question is military personnel, female, has been expelled, is currently under investigation or has retired:
  Information on the plenary sessions of the Central Committee.
  Information on the composition of the Central Committee and the composition of the elected bodies of the Central Committee.
  Information on the composition of the Supreme People's Assembly and it's Standing Committee.
  Information on the composition of the 5th Government of the DPRK.
  A list of every minister that served in the DPRK government since its inception until 1980.

Bibliography
 

6th Central Committee of the Workers' Party of Korea
1980 establishments in North Korea
2016 disestablishments in North Korea